Kiefer is a town in Creek County, Oklahoma, United States. The population was 1,685 at the 2010 census, an increase of 64.2 percent over the figure of 1,026 recorded in 2000.

History
Kiefer was originally known as "Praper" when a post office was first established in 1901. The St. Louis, Oklahoma and Southern Railway (later the St. Louis and San Francisco Railway) constructed a line south from Sapulpa through Praper between 1900 and 1901. The route is today operated by BNSF.  Praper became an oil boom town by 1906, when it grew into a major shipping point for crude from the Glenn Pool field. The post office was renamed "Kiefer" on December 12, 1906. According to the Encyclopedia of Oklahoma History and Culture, the name honored at least one of three different people named Kiefer who lived in the area.

Kiefer voted to incorporate on November 20, 1908. The 1910 census reported a population of 1,197 inhabitants. This increased to 1,663 in 1920.

In the early days, Kiefer was on the route of the Sapulpa & Interurban Railway (“S&I”) streetcar/interurban line connecting to Tulsa through Sapulpa; S&I subsequently went through a series of mergers and name changes, with only the Tulsa-to-Sapulpa portion continuing as the Tulsa-Sapulpa Union Railway.

The Kiefer Searchlight was a weekly newspaper published in Kiefer that included local, state, and national news along with advertising.  123 issues from 1908 to 1911 are available online.

In the 21st Century, Kiefer is mostly a commuter town, with 94.6 percent of workers living in town commuting to jobs elsewhere, primarily in Tulsa.  However, it is also headquarters for Bridge Crane Specialists, a company involved in the design, manufacturing, installation, and servicing of overhead and work station crane systems.

Kiefer is the site of an extensive residence known to locals as the Kiefer Castle, having been built to resemble a fairy-tale castle.

Geography
Kiefer is located in eastern Creek County at  (35.943993, -96.059565). U.S. Highway 75A passes through the center of the town, leading north  to the center of Sapulpa, the county seat, and south  to Mounds. Oklahoma State Highway 67 leads east from Kiefer  to the U.S. Route 75 freeway in Glenpool.

Education

Kiefer has an elementary, middle and high school. The school teams are known as the Trojans.

Demographics

As of the census of 2020, there were 10,971 people, 898 households, and 796 families residing in the town. There were 410 housing units at an average density of 224.3 per square mile (86.5/km2). The racial makeup of the town was 85.09% White, 0.19% African American, 9.45% Native American, 0.19% Asian, 0.58% from other races, and 4.48% from two or more races. Hispanic or Latino of any race were 3.12% of the population.

There were 373 households, out of which 38.9% had children under the age of 18 living with them, 57.6% were married couples living together, 12.9% had a female householder with no husband present, and 24.4% were non-families. 20.4% of all households were made up of individuals, and 5.1% had someone living alone who was 65 years of age or older. The average household size was 2.75 and the average family size was 3.19.

In the town, the population was spread out, with 29.7% under the age of 18, 9.0% from 18 to 24, 32.1% from 25 to 44, 21.2% from 45 to 64, and 8.1% who were 65 years of age or older. The median age was 33 years. For every 100 females, there were 95.8 males. For every 100 females age 18 and over, there were 92.8 males.

The median income for a household in the town was $34,844, and the median income for a family was $42,500. Males had a median income of $30,739 versus $22,386 for females. The per capita income for the town was $14,479. About 7.8% of families and 11.6% of the population were below the poverty line, including 13.4% of those under age 18 and 13.8% of those age 65 or over.

References

External links
 Kiefer Police Department

Towns in Creek County, Oklahoma
Towns in Oklahoma
Populated places established in 1901
1901 establishments in Indian Territory